Tânia Ishii (born 30 October 1968) is a Brazilian judoka. She competed in the women's half-middleweight event at the 1992 Summer Olympics.

References

External links
 

1968 births
Living people
Brazilian female judoka
Olympic judoka of Brazil
Judoka at the 1992 Summer Olympics
Sportspeople from São Paulo
Pan American Games medalists in judo
Pan American Games bronze medalists for Brazil
Judoka at the 1983 Pan American Games
21st-century Brazilian women
20th-century Brazilian women